The T-98 Kombat is a wheeled armoured vehicle built by Kombat Armouring, a subsidiary of Laura Group, in St. Petersburg, Russia. The name, is shorthand for "komandir batalyona" (командир батальона - battalion commander). The Kombat is a fast armoured off-road vehicles with a top speed of 180 km/h.

There are two basic versions of the  T-98 Kombat based on General Motors components, including an 8.1 litre Vortec engine, Allison transmission, and GM heavy duty suspensions. They are:

 The “VIP” has no frame and has a monocoque double steel body. The highest protection level uses a composite armor of ceramic between steel layers. VIP Kombats have many options, including leather and wood in the interior.
 The “Utility” is designed for special operations missions.

The armoured body is based on a "metal-ceramic sandwich with cellular filler" technology. The monocoque body provides protection against mine blasts.

It is driven by a 340 hp V8, which gives the lightest T-98 a top speed of 111 mph (180 km/h), making it one of the fastest all-terrain armoured vehicles in the world. The T-98 contains satellite navigation, a flat-screen television which can play DVD, climate control, and an interior containing a mix of leather and wood. All running gear and electronics are provided by General Motors. Kombat Armouring claims that the most highly armoured T-98 will protect occupants from bullets up to 12.7 mm, shotguns, mines and ramming.

Specifications

Engines:
 8.1L VORTEC 8100 V8 with  @ 4200 rpm producing  of torque @ 3200 rpm
 6.6L DURAMAX Turbo Diesel 6600 V8 with  @ 3100 rpm producing  of torque @ 1800 rpm

Ground Clearance: 300 mm
Track Width: 1760 mm

Transmission: Allison 1000   5-speed automatic

Transfer Case: AUTOTRAC 4WD 2- speed

Fuel Capacity: 140 litre (36 gal)

Electrical: one or two 12-volt, 105 amp alternators

Top Speed: 180 km/h (111 mph) (340 hp version)

Suspension:

 Independent front suspension with torsion bars and stabilizer bar
 Rear suspension with two stage multileaf springs
 Rear locking differential

Versions

 high mobility armored vehicle - 5-door station wagon
 armored troop carrier - 3-door panel truck
 fast attack vehicle - 4-door pickup truck
 infantry vehicle for special operations - 2-door pickup truck

Armament

 Vehicle-mounted 23 mm autocannon
 14.5 mm machine gun (KPVT)
 12.7mm machine gun (KORD)
 55 mm small-sized remotely controlled smoke grenade launching system

Operators
Most are VIP versions sold to the United Arab Emirates, Saudi Arabia, Estonia, Russia, Mauritius, and the US.

In popular culture
 A gold colored version of the T-98 Kombat appears in the 2012 comedy The Dictator.
 The T-98 Kombat also appears in the 2014 action movie The November Man.
In Grand Theft Auto V, the vehicle similar to T-98 Kombat is introduced in the Gunrunning DLC under the name the Nightshark.

See also
 HMMWV
 VLEGA Gaucho

References

External links

 Manufacturer's page in Russian 
 Pictures
 GIZMAG article

Off-road vehicles
Armoured fighting vehicles of Russia
GAZ